Johanna Gustavsson (born 13 December 1992) is a Swedish professional golfer and member of the Ladies European Tour. In 2022, she was runner-up at the Saudi Ladies International, the Women's NSW Open and the Aramco Team Series – Bangkok, before captaining the winning team at the Aramco Team Series – New York.

Professional career
Gustavsson finished in fourth place at the Lalla Aicha Ladies European Tour School pre-qualifying in 2014, but narrowly missed out at the final stage, and joined the 2015 LET Access Series. She won her first professional event, the 2015 Larvik Ladies Open, in a record-breaking 14-hole sudden-death playoff against Natalia Escuriola Martinez of Spain. Both players recorded an opening bogey on the first playoff hole, the 368 yard par-4 9th at Larvik Golf Club in Norway, which they played three times before alternating between the 1st and 9th holes until the 10th extra hole. They then moved back to the 9th hole until Gustavsson was able to break the deadlock on the 14th extra hole with a birdie three. 

The Larvik Ladies Open victory, dual-ranked between the LET Access Series and the Swedish Golf Tour, helped Gustavsson win the 2015 Swedish Golf Tour Order of Merit and place fourth on the LETAS Order of Merit, securing her card for the 2016 Ladies European Tour. 

In 2017, she was runner-up at the Jabra Ladies Open, earning entry to her first major, the 2017 Evian Championship, where she did not make the cut.

Gustavsson represented her country at the 2018 European Golf Team Championships, teaming up with Oscar Florén, Daniel Jennevret and Julia Engström to win the bronze medal in the mixed team competition.

In 2019 she ended the season ranked 46th on the LET Order of Merit, and in 2020 she finished 19th, after making the cut at the Women's British Open and recording top-10 finishes at the Australian Ladies Classic and the Saudi Ladies Team International.

In 2022, Gustavsson took her game to a new level, and finished runner-up in 3 of her first 9 LET starts. In March, she was joint runner-up with Kristýna Napoleaová behind Georgia Hall at the 2022 Saudi Ladies International. In May, she was solo runner-up behind Maja Stark at the Women's NSW Open in Australia, and again at the Aramco Team Series – Bangkok, 3 strokes behind Manon De Roey. The run left her in second spot in the LET Order of Merit, behind only her compatriot Maja Stark.

She captained the winning team at the Aramco Team Series – New York, and together with Jessica Karlsson and Karolin Lampert won by one stroke ahead of a team captained by Nelly Korda.

Amateur wins
2009 (1) Skandia Tour Regional #4 - Södermanland 
2010 (1) Skandia Tour Regional #1 - Östergötland 
2011 (1) Skandia Tour Riks #6 - Västergötland 
2013 (3) Skandia Tour Riks #2 - Östergötland, Skandia Tour Regional #1 - Örebro Län, McDonalds Juniorpokal

Professional wins (4)

LET Access Series wins (2)

LET Access Series playoff record (1–0)

Swedish Golf Tour wins (1)
2016 Örebro Ladies Open

Santander Golf Tour wins (1)
2019 Santander Golf Tour Barcelona

Team appearances
Professional
European Championships (representing Sweden): 2018

References

External links

 

Swedish female golfers
Ladies European Tour golfers
Sportspeople from Örebro
1992 births
Living people